The 2006 USG Sheetrock 400 was a NASCAR Nextel Cup Series race held on July 9, 2006, at Chicagoland Speedway in Joliet, Illinois. The race was the 18th of the 2006 NASCAR Nextel Cup Series season. Roush Racing's Matt Kenseth led the most laps, while Jeff Gordon of Hendrick Motorsports won the race on a green-white-checker finish, which extended the race from 267 laps to 270.

Qualifying

Race recap
Pole-sitter Jeff Burton led much of the early portion of the race, but Jeff Gordon then took the lead after a strong green-flag pit stop. On lap 68, the first caution flag was flown for debris on the track, shuffling the driver order and giving the lead to Kevin Harvick. With four laps to go, Gordon drove into a slowing Matt Kenseth's rear bumper, spinning him. On the green-white-checker finish, Gordon led the final laps to win his 75th career Cup Series victory and second of 2006 with a 0.461 second lead over Burton, followed by Kyle Busch, Kevin Harvick, and defending race winner Dale Earnhardt Jr. Points leader Jimmie Johnson, Reed Sorenson, Kurt Busch, Clint Bowyer and J. J. Yeley closed out the top ten. Meanwhile, Kenseth was involved in a second wreck and ran out of fuel, but managed to finish the race on the lead lap and finished 22nd.

After the race, the points standings saw Johnson pull away from Kenseth, with the eight-point margin between them increasing to 51, with Johnson leading Kenseth 2,651 points to 2,600. Earnhardt Jr. was third with 2,394 points, Burton had 2,327 points, and Kasey Kahne rounded out the top five with 2,303. Mark Martin (2,291), Tony Stewart (2,274), Kyle Busch (2,265), Harvick (2,253) and Gordon (2,219) completed the top ten points standings.

Results

Standings after the race

References 

USG Sheetrock 400
USG Sheetrock 400
NASCAR races at Chicagoland Speedway
July 2006 sports events in the United States